Vijay Kumar Saraswat is an Indian scientist who formerly served as the Director General of the Defence Research and Development Organisation (DRDO) and the Chief Scientific Advisor to the Indian Minister of Defence. He retired on 31 May 2003 and presently member of NITI Aayog i.e. Planning Commission of India and Chancellor of Jawaharlal Nehru University. and President of Sree Chitra Tirunal Institute for Medical Sciences and Technology, Trivandrum

Saraswat is the key scientist in the development of the Prithvi missile and its induction in the Indian armed forces. He is a recipient of the Padma Shri and Padma Bhushan from the Government of India.

Early life

Born on 25 May 1949 in Danaoli locality in Gwalior, Saraswat completed his Bachelors in Engineering from Madhav Institute of Technology and Science Gwalior, M.P. He earned a Master of Engineering degree from Indian Institute of Science (IISc) followed by a Doctorate in Propulsion Engineering from Osmania University.

Honors

Saraswat is fellow of National Academy of Engineering, Aeronautical Society of India, Astronautical Society of India, and Institution of Engineers. He is a member of governing council of SAMEER and member of Board of Research of AICTE, CSIR labs, and board of studies of Osmania University. He is chairman, Combustion Institute (Indian Section), and Aeronautical Society of India (Hyderabad Branch). Dr. Saraswat is a forerunner in the development of number of critical missile technologies that were under denial due to the
Missile Technology Control Regime, thus making India self-reliant in Missile Technologies. He has headed various committees of
national importance.

Saraswat is the recipient of DRDO Scientist of the Year Award – 1987, National Aeronautical Prize – 1993, DRDO Technology Transfer Award – 1996 and Performance Excellence Award – 1999. For his outstanding contributions to the Nation, he has been conferred with Padma Shri in 1998 and Padma Bhusan in 2013. In January 2010 & December 2012 he was awarded with honorary doctorate from Sardar Vallabhbhai National Institute of Technology, Surat, SRM Institute of Science and Technology Chennai and Jawaharlal Nehru Technological University, Hyderabad respectively. He received the Aryabhata Award in 2011.

Issues and Controversies
After internal audit reports and CAG raising red flags over many of V. K. Saraswat's decisions, the Ministry of Defence decided to impose severe restrictions on his financial powers. Government of India in 2013 turned down his extension as DRDO's Chief.

References

Scientists from Madhya Pradesh
Living people
Recipients of the Padma Shri in science & engineering
1949 births
Recipients of the Padma Bhushan in science & engineering
Osmania University alumni
People from Gwalior district
Indian military engineers
Indian Institute of Science alumni
20th-century Indian engineers